Dr. Stone (stylized as Dr.STONE) is a Japanese manga series written by Riichiro Inagaki and illustrated by the South Korean artist Boichi. It was serialized in Shueisha's Weekly Shōnen Jump from March 2017 to March 2022, with its chapters collected in twenty-six tankōbon volumes. The story follows teenage scientific genius Senku Ishigami, who plans to rebuild civilization after humanity was mysteriously petrified for 3,700 years. Viz Media licensed the manga in North America. Shueisha began to simulpublish the series in English on the website and app Manga Plus in January 2019.

An anime television series adaptation produced by TMS Entertainment, aired on Tokyo MX from July to December 2019. A second season of the anime series focused on the "Stone Wars" arc aired from January to March 2021. A third season is set to premiere in April 2023. A television special titled Dr. Stone: Ryusui premiered in July 2022.

By June 2022, the manga had over 14 million copies in circulation. In 2019, Dr. Stone won the 64th Shogakukan Manga Award for the shōnen category.

Plot

In the year 2019 AD, a mysterious flash suddenly petrifies nearly all human life. The human race frozen in stone for 3,700 years, until in April 5738, a 15-year-old prodigy named Senku Ishigami is suddenly revived to find himself in a world where all traces of human civilization have been eroded by time. Senku sets up a base camp and begins to study the petrified humans in order to determine the cause of the event, as well as a cure. Over the next six months, Senku's friend Taiju Oki wakes up and Senku learns their revival was made possible with nitric acid. With this discovery, they develop a compound that will allow them to instantly revive others. They begin by reviving a famous high school martial artist named Tsukasa Shishio and their classmate (and Taiju's crush) Yuzuriha Ogawa with the goal of rebuilding civilization with a focus on science.

Tsukasa ultimately reveals that he opposes Senku's idea of forming a new scientific civilization, believing the old world was tainted and should not be restored. Instead, he desires to establish a new world order based on power and strength, going so far as to destroy any petrified adults he encounters in order to prevent them from interfering with his goals. After extorting the formula for the revival compound from Senku, Tsukasa attempts to murder him when he realized that Senku knows how to create weapons that he cannot defend against. Believing he successfully killed Senku, Tsukasa leaves to begin establishing his own faction in the Stone World.

After recovering from his near death experience, Senku discovers a tribe of people already living on the planet and sees this as an opportunity to create his Kingdom of Science. These people are originally hesitant, but eventually learn the benefits that science can bring to their survival. Over time, Senku becomes more trusted by the tribe, eventually being taught of their past where he discovers that the village was started by his adoptive father Byakuya, along with five other astronauts, who were unaffected due to being in the International Space Station at the time of the petrification event. Together with his new allies and friends, Senku's Kingdom of Science engages in a war with the Tsukasa Empire, ultimately emerging victorious and affirming themselves as a force to be reckoned with. After the victory, they discover that Senku's adopted father had left precious metals which can be used as catalysts to mass-produce revival fluid in the nearby island which is now inhabited by a tribe known as the Petrification Kingdom, who possess the device used to petrify the world so long ago.

Production
Riichiro Inagaki first began working on Dr. Stone with the initial idea of creating a protagonist that was considered a relatively normal character unlike many others within the genre. He decided that his best approach with creating Senku was to create a character that was ambitious and chose to actively push themselves through hard work in order to fulfill their goals. He also wanted to create a character that closely resembled the character Agon Kongo from his own manga serialization Eyeshield 21 in terms of personality and characteristics and felt that it was appropriate for the chosen setting. Inagaki was personally fascinated by the topic of science as a child and sought to create a science-based story for entertainment purposes that also featured common themes and messages that would be compelling for the audience. In regards to influences, Inagaki stated that Video Girl Ai was a series that had a significant impact on the story's development.

Inagaki works remotely with his illustrator Boichi in which the former sends his own created storyboards to the latter through his own editor. By the time the pair began working on the series, Inagaki was already quite familiar with Boichi's work as an artist and initially struggled with expressing his ideas for his collaborator to illustrate, often times being uncertain about how to draw some of Senku's inventions and how to make them feel impressive. While developing the setting for the series, Boichi grew captivated imagining how to create the look of a futuristic Japan set 3700 years after humanity had turned to stone. He settled upon the idea of creating a vast beautiful world in which Japan's nature was left untarnished due to the loss of humanity's influence. When asked about scientific accuracies, Inagaki revealed that both himself and Boichi have conducted research into the subject during the development of the series while also receiving help from a consultant.

Adaptation
Director Shinya Iino expressed that one of the challenges with adapting the series into animation was determining how the backgrounds would appear in a different medium. He would go on to state that Boichi had provided his assistance by sending his own rough sketches as a way to facilitate the adaptation process. Iino would also state that the theme of science featured in the manga captured his attention to the series as it wasn't a theme that was featured in many other shonen series.

Media

Manga

Written by Riichiro Inagaki and illustrated by Boichi, Dr. Stone debuted in Shueisha's shōnen manga magazine Weekly Shōnen Jump on March 6, 2017. It was one from a number of story proposals Inagaki brought to his editor, who chose it because he had no idea how it would develop. Boichi, who was looking for a story to work on, was approached around the time Inagaki (a fan of his art) finished the storyboards for chapter 3. The series ended serialization on March 7, 2022. Shueisha collected its 232 individual chapters into twenty-six tankōbon volumes, released between July 7, 2017, and July 4, 2022. An additional chapter was published on July 4, 2022.

At their panel at Anime Boston, Viz Media announced their license of the manga, and the first volume was published in September 2018. Shueisha began to simulpublish the series in English on the website and app Manga Plus in January 2019.

A nine-chapter spin-off, Dr. Stone Reboot: Byakuya, was published in Weekly Shōnen Jump from October 28 to December 23, 2019. A collected tankōbon volume was released on March 4, 2020. Viz Media published the volume on March 2, 2021.

Anime

An anime television series adaptation was announced in the 51st issue of Weekly Shōnen Jump on November 19, 2018. The series is animated by TMS Entertainment, with Shinya Iino as director, Yuichiro Kido as scriptwriter, and Yuko Iwasa as character designer. Tatsuya Kato, Hiroaki Tsutsumi, and Yuki Kanesaka composed the series' music. The series aired from July 5 to December 13, 2019 on Tokyo MX and other channels. It ran for 24 episodes. The first opening theme is "Good Morning World!" by Burnout Syndromes, while the series' first ending theme is "Life" by Rude-α. The second opening theme is "Sangenshoku" by Pelican Fanclub, while the series' second ending theme is "Yume No Youna" by Saeki YouthK.

A second season of the anime adaptation was announced after the first season's finale. The second season focused on the story of the "Stone Wars" arc from the manga series. Officially titled as Dr. Stone: Stone Wars, the second season aired from January 14 to March 25, 2021. It ran for 11 episodes. The opening theme for the second season is "Rakuen" by Fujifabric, while the ending theme for the second season is "Koe?" by Hatena.

A sequel to the TV series was announced after second season's final episode aired. At the Jump Festa 2022 event, it was revealed that a third season will premiere in 2023. A television special titled Dr. Stone: Ryusui that focuses on the character Ryusui Nanami premiered on July 10, 2022. Shūhei Matsushita directed the special, while the rest of the main staff are returning from previous seasons. After the airing of the special, the third season's title was revealed to be Dr. Stone: New World, with Matsushita returning to direct. It is set to premiere on April 6, 2023, and will consist of two split cours. The opening theme for the third season is "Wasuregataki" by Huwie Ishizaki.

The series is streamed by Crunchyroll worldwide outside of Asia, and Funimation produced a simuldub. Medialink holds the license to the series in Southeast Asia, streaming it on iQIYI and Ani-One Asia YouTube channel. The English dub of the anime began airing on Adult Swim's Toonami programming block on August 25, 2019. Dr. Stone: Stone Wars premiered on Toonami on May 16, 2021.

Video game
In December 2020, it was announced that a smartphone game based on the series would be released in 2021. The game will be developed by Poppin Games Japan and will be a strategy game with elements of open world games, role-playing games, and raising games.

Reception

Manga
Dr. Stone won the 64th Shogakukan Manga Award for the shōnen category in 2019. The series placed second on the fourth Next Manga Awards in 2018. Dr. Stone ranked 15th, along with Keep Your Hands Off Eizouken!, on Takarajimasha's Kono Manga ga Sugoi! list of top manga of 2018 for male readers. The series ranked 17th, alongside Sweat and Soap and Heterogenia Linguistico, on Kono Manga ga Sugoi! list of best manga of 2019 for male readers. Dr. Stone was one of the Jury Recommended Works in the Manga Division at the 21st Japan Media Arts Festival in 2018.

By April 2021, the manga had over 10 million copies in circulation; and over 14 million copies in circulation by June 2022. On TV Asahi's Manga Sōsenkyo 2021 poll, in which 150.000 people voted for their top 100 manga series, Dr. Stone ranked 100th. Barnes & Noble listed Dr. Stone on their list of "Our Favorite Manga of 2018".

Before its anime series adaptation, Nicholas Dupree of Anime News Network included Dr. Stone on his list of "The Most Underrated Shonen Jump Manga". Dupree wrote that the series is "brimming with surprisingly accurate facts about chemistry and engineering", additionally commenting: "Tons of Jump manga can make impassioned speeches about the power of friendship or determination, but only Dr. Stone can do the same for the power of a light bulb". The series was also well-received for how original its premise was compared to many other titles in the post-apocalyptic genre. The characterization of Senku also received praise for how revitalizing he was presented as a shonen protagonist, primarily due to the fact that he relied heavily on his intelligence rather than physical strength.

Anime
In November 2019, Crunchyroll listed Dr. Stone in their "Top 25 best anime of the 2010s". IGN also listed Dr. Stone among the best anime series of the 2010s. Gadget Tsūshin listed Senku's catchphrase "This is exhilarating!" in their 2019 anime buzzwords list. Dr. Stone was the eighth most watched anime series on Netflix in Japan in 2019. In 2020, Senku won the "Best Protagonist" category at the 4th Crunchyroll Anime Awards. The second season was praised for its pacing and how it managed to conclude Senku and Tsukasa's rivalry. It has also been noted for being scientifically accurate. Kari Byron of Mythbusters praised much of the scientific accuracies presented in the show while also noting some of the liberties the creators took. She also commented that Senku's character shared many similarities to members of her own team.

References

External links
 
 
 at Viz Media

2019 anime television series debuts
Adventure anime and manga
Anime series based on manga
Chemistry in fiction
Crunchyroll anime
Fiction set in the 6th millennium
Funimation
Medialink
Post-apocalyptic anime and manga
Science fiction anime and manga
Shueisha manga
Shōnen manga
TMS Entertainment
Toho Animation
Tokyo MX original programming
Toonami
Upcoming anime television series
Viz Media manga
Winners of the Shogakukan Manga Award for shōnen manga